Iowa Park is a city in Wichita County, Texas, United States. It is part of the Wichita Falls, Texas metropolitan statistical area. The population was 6,355 at the 2010 census.

Geography

Iowa Park is located at  (33.953731, –98.671158).

According to the United States Census Bureau, the city has a total area of 4.0 square miles (10.4 km), of which, 3.6 square miles (9.4 km) of it are land and 0.4 square miles (1.0 km) of it (9.68%) is covered by  water.

Demographics

2020 census

As of the 2020 United States census, there were 6,535 people, 2,579 households, and 1,605 families residing in the city.

2000 census
As of the census of 2000,  6,431 people, 2,460 households, and 1,867 families resided in the city. The population density was 1,766.6 people per square mile (682.1/km). The 2,609 housing units averaged 716.1 per square mile (276.5/km). The racial makeup of the city was 95.96% White, 0.26% African American, 1.09% Native American, 0.37% Asian, 0.93% from other races, and 1.38% from two or more races. Hispanic or Latinos of any race were 3.58% of the population.

Of the 2,460 households,  37.1% had children under the age of 18 living with them, 60.7% were married couples living together, 11.2% had a female householder with no husband present, and 24.1% were not families. About  21.5% of all households were made up of individuals, and 9.3% had someone living alone who was 65 years of age or older. The average household size was 2.59 and the average family size was 3.02.

In the city, the population was distributed as 27.5% under the age of 18, 8.4% from 18 to 24, 28.4% from 25 to 44, 21.8% from 45 to 64, and 14.0% who were 65 years of age or older. The median age was 37 years. For every 100 females, there were 92.4 males. For every 100 females age 18 and over, there were 89.2 males.

The median income for a household in the city was $40,725, and for a family was $45,199. Males had a median income of $31,372 versus $21,237 for females. The per capita income for the city was $16,882. About 7.1% of families and 1.0% of the population were below the poverty line, including 18.4% of those under age 18 and 6.3% of those age 65 or over. The  population of Iowa Park has increased to around 6,400 as of 2012. New businesses and new construction can be seen in and around Iowa Park over the last 5 years.

Education
The City of Iowa Park is served by the Iowa Park Consolidated Independent School District.

History
Iowa Park was founded in 1888 alongside the tracks of the Fort Worth and Denver City Railway by D. C. and A. J. Kolp. Originally called Daggett Switch, it soon became a shipping point for cotton and wheat. Hard times came in the early 1890s when a drought hit, but by  1900, the town had a significant population.

The population fell during the early part of the century, but an oil discovery in 1918 reversed the dip. By 1926, the population was staying higher. A concrete highway connecting Iowa Park with Wichita Falls was built in 1927. In the mid-1930s, Iowa Park maintained its population, while most other towns declined.

Sheppard Air Force Base provided a minor drawback in the 1950s, but by the end of the decade, the population was still holding up. The late 1960s brought two state football championships and a 20% growth in population which continued into the '70s.

Government and infrastructure
The United States Postal Service operates the Iowa Park Post Office.

The Texas Department of Criminal Justice operates the James V. Allred Unit in Wichita Falls, in proximity to Iowa Park.

Climate
The climate in this area is characterized by hot, humid summers and generally mild to cool winters.  According to the Köppen climate classification system, Iowa Park has a humid subtropical climate, Cfa on climate maps.

References

External links

 City of Iowa Park – Official Website.
 Iowa Park Consolidated Independent School District – Official Website.

Cities in Texas
Cities in Wichita County, Texas
Wichita Falls metropolitan area